Alberto Félix (born 16 July 1969) is a Mexican modern pentathlete. He competed at the 1992 Summer Olympics.

References

External links
 

1969 births
Living people
Mexican male modern pentathletes
Olympic modern pentathletes of Mexico
Modern pentathletes at the 1992 Summer Olympics